Vidöåsen is a locality situated in Hammarö Municipality, Värmland County, Sweden with 272 inhabitants in 2010.

References 

Populated places in Värmland County
Populated places in Hammarö Municipality